Gerő Mály (1884–1952) was a Hungarian film actor who appeared in over sixty films during his career, generally in supporting roles. Mály starred in the 1929 German film Melody of the Heart, the first sound film released by the German studio UFA. In 1946 he emigrated to the United States.

Selected filmography
 The Colonel (1917)
 Melody of the Heart (1929)
 Romance of Ida (1934)
 Cafe Moscow (1936)
 I May See Her Once a Week (1937)
 Family Bonus (1937)
 Viki (1937)
 Tales of Budapest (1937)
 Hotel Kikelet (1937)
 Magda Expelled (1938)
 Black Diamonds (1938)
 Rozmaring (1938)
 Money Talks (1940)
 Seven Plum Trees (1940)
 A Szerelem nem Szégyen (1940)
 Katyi (1942)

References

Bibliography
 Hardt, Ursula. From Caligari to California: Erich Pommer's Life in the International Film Wars. Berghahn Books, 1996

External links

1884 births
1952 deaths
People from Odorheiu Secuiesc
Hungarian male film actors
Hungarian male silent film actors
20th-century Hungarian male actors